Invisible Sun may refer to:

Invisible Sun, a song by English rock group the Police
Invisible Sun (Liam Gallagher song), a song by English musician Liam Gallagher
Invisible Sun (role-playing game), a surrealistic fantasy tabletop role-playing game by Monte Cook